Hagersville is a populated place situated in East Rockhill Township in Bucks County, Pennsylvania, United States.

History 

Hagersville post office was established in 1851, with Francis Gerhard as postmaster. The village was named for Colonel George Hager, who was a politician of local prominence. Samuel Hager, another member of this influential family, was the founder of Perkasie. By the 1870s, Hagersville had a population of approximately 150 and had a store and hotel, as well as blacksmith and wheelwright shops which thrived on the two coach factories also located here. Frederick Heany, son of a Rockhill settler/German immigrant, owned the hotel circa 1875. He is notable as one of the leaders of the Fries Rebellion.

References

Populated places in Bucks County, Pennsylvania